Campagnone Common is a historic park in Lawrence, Massachusetts. The park is the main park for the city and is named for the three Campagnone brothers who gave their lives during World War II.

Background
The park is located on Common Street and sits directly across from the Lawrence city hall. The park contains a baseball field, the Robert Frost Fountain, a playground located near Jackson Street.

The city has placed a number of war memorials at the park. There is a Civil War memorial, a World War II memorial, a Spanish-American War memorial, Gulf War memorial, and the Korean War memorial.

References

History of Lawrence, Massachusetts
Parks in Essex County, Massachusetts